European French is the variety of French spoken in Europe, either in French speaking countries or area.

Geographic distribution 

Among varieties of European French, we can find: 
French of France, the predominant variety of the French language in France, Monaco and Andorra
Belgian French, the variety of French language spoken mainly in the French Community of Belgium
Swiss French, the variety spoken in the French-speaking area of Switzerland
Luxembourg French, the variety spoken in the French-speaking area of Luxembourg
And also:
 Jersey Legal French, the official dialect of French used administratively in Jersey.
 Aostan French, the variety of French spoken in the Aosta Valley, Italy.

See also
French language, a Romance language
French (disambiguation)
European English

References

Further reading 

 
 
 

French language
Languages of Europe
French dialects